Larks, They Crazy is the debut album of Robin Holcomb, released in 1989 through Sound Aspects Records.

Track listing

Personnel 
Musicians
Marty Ehrlich –  bass clarinet, alto saxophone, soprano saxophone
David Hofstra – bass guitar, tuba
Robin Holcomb – piano, vocals
Wayne Horvitz – Yamaha DX7, sampler, production
Bobby Previte – drums
Doug Wieselman – clarinet, tenor saxophone
Production and additional personnel
Steve Burgh – engineering
Tom Chargin – photography
Harold Vits – design

References

External links 
 

1989 albums
Robin Holcomb albums